Arbën/Arbër, from which derived Arbënesh/Arbëresh  originally meant all Albanians, until the 18th century. Today it is used for different groups of Albanian origin, including:

Arbër (given name), an Albanian masculine given name
Arbëreshë people, a population group of Italy
Arbëresh, the language variety spoken by the Arbëreshë
Arvanites, a population group of Greece
Arvanitika, the language variety spoken by the Arvanites
Arbanasi people, a population group of Croatia
Arbanasi dialect

See also
Arbanasi (disambiguation)

Language and nationality disambiguation pages